Ives Peak, elevation , is located in the Goat Rocks on the border of Lewis and Yakima Counties, in the U.S. state of Washington. Ives Peak is within the Goat Rocks Wilderness and the McCall Glacier on its eastern slopes. Additionally, the Pacific Crest National Scenic Trail is near the west slopes of the peak.

It is the fourth highest peak in the Goat Rocks Wilderness.

References

Mountains of Washington (state)
Gifford Pinchot National Forest
Goat Rocks
Mountains of Lewis County, Washington
Mountains of Yakima County, Washington